1983 JSL Cup Final was the eighth final of the JSL Cup competition. The final was played at Yamanashi Prefectural Stadium in Yamanashi on June 26, 1983. Yanmar Diesel won the championship.

Overview
Yanmar Diesel won their 2nd title, by defeating Nissan Motors 1–0.

Match details

See also
1983 JSL Cup

References

JSL Cup
1983 in Japanese football
Cerezo Osaka matches
Yokohama F. Marinos matches